Sequoia High School (established in 1895) is a high school in downtown Redwood City, California, United States. Today, it is one of the few schools to offer the International Baccalaureate (IB) Diploma Programme within the San Francisco Bay Area.

About 
Sequoia High School is part of the Sequoia Union High School District. Most students attend middle school at Clifford School, Kennedy Middle School, McKinley Institute of Technology, or North Star Academy in Redwood City, or Central Middle School in San Carlos. The school maintains a vast array of clubs, extracurricular activities, and sports teams, in addition to a student newspaper, Yearbook team, and student government program.

The school grounds, located on 35 acres, include a Japanese Tea Garden which was built in 1929 by students, the performing arts venue Carrington Hall, and a number of historical trees, including the Giant Sequoia, Monkey-puzzle tree, Australian Tea tree, Ginkgo biloba trees, Cork Oak tree and many others. Classrooms are spread out among five main wings, including the newest "M" (music) wing, completed in 2018.

History 
Established in 1895, Sequoia is the oldest high school in San Mateo County, and was founded as a preparatory school for Stanford University. When the school was founded, it was the only high school on the Peninsula between San Francisco and Santa Clara. Initially when opening, the school occupied the third floor of the Redwood City Grammar School, with the two lower floors of the building for elementary and middle school students.

The present-day campus is located on the grounds of the former estate of Horace Hawes, author of the legislative bill that created San Mateo County. The present day campus, purchased for $80,000, was constructed in the 1920s and opened in 1924, in a Spanish Colonial Revival architecture style. The original campus buildings were designed by architects Coffey and Werner. The Argo Bell Tower campanile was built in 1923, and named after the former principal (from 1921 to 1948) Clarence Argo. Carrington Hall , the school auditorium, was named after a former music and art teacher at the school, Otis M. Carrington.

Remnants of the site's earlier owners, from over 115 years ago, are still visible on campus today, including an original set of concrete benches and walls on the eastern expanse of the school, built prior to 1905. The gazebo in the Japanese Tea Garden has been recently renovated, but remains in an identical location to a similar structure placed in the "rock garden" (today, the Tea Garden) in 1905.

The school was added to the National Register of Historic Places as a historic district in 1995, under its former name Sequoia Union High School.

On September 13, 2007, Governor Arnold Schwarzenegger visited Sequoia High School to sign bill SB 35, which prohibits persons who are under the age of 18 years from using a wireless telephone or other mobile service device while operating a motor vehicle.

On September 12, 2012, U.S. Secretary of Education Arne Duncan began a back-to-school tour on Sequoia's campus, praising the school as an example of a "model school" for its commitment to student success and Title I Academic Achievement award. Among other panelists at the discussion was Salman Khan, founder of Khan Academy.

Team name and mascot 
In the fall of 1925, Sequoia's mascot and athletic team names were selected as the Cherokees, in honor of the creator of the Cherokee language, Sequoyah. The foreword of Sequoia's 1926 annual referenced the change, noting it was intended to "honor. . .the Cherokees, both past and present." In 2001, following presentations from students, teachers, and the school's Alumni Association, the Board of Trustees voted to change the mascot, while still retaining the Cherokees team name. The student body voted on the new mascot, with Ravens capturing the most votes, and the Scorpions second.

Beginning in 2018, several students, along with a faculty member and a few Sequoia parents, formed the "Ready for Ravens" initiative, arguing that continuing to use the Cherokee team name was hurtful to Native American tribes and perpetuated stereotypes about native people. Although many students and community members supported the change, others argued that the Cherokee name was, in fact, honoring the Cherokee tribe. The student group organized surveys, presented to the Board of Trustees, met with the Alumni Association, and produced an informative video capturing both sides of the issue. In early April 2019, after collecting survey responses from over 1,200 students, parents, faculty, and community members, the students presented to the Board of Trustees, who voted in favor of switching the team name to the Ravens.

In the months since, the administration has undergone efforts to replace references to the Cherokees on campus, including painting a new Ravens mural inside a gym and outside another gym. The 2020 Yearbook, commemorating Sequoia's 125th year, officially acknowledged the change and paid homage to the 1926 annual with an updated foreword reflecting recent changes to the team name and mascot.

Specialized programs

Advancement Via Individual Determination (AVID) 
Sequoia provides classes, in partnership with the nationwide Advancement Via Individual Organization, to offer support for students related to taking advanced classes, time management, college applications, and more. The class is taught for one period every day, typically 7th period, as Sequoia operates on a schedule where only 0 and 7th period classes meet daily, a requirement for the AVID program. Students involved in AVID remain with the same teacher and classmates all four years of high school, and are expected to take notes in class daily, complete all college-preparatory classes with a "C" or higher, and meet with their teachers for progress reports. As the program is designed for students "in the middle" who could benefit from extra support, most students come from backgrounds that are historically underrepresented in post-secondary education, or who are the first in their family to attend college.

BUILD 
Designed to prepare students for careers in business and entrepreneurship, since the 2008–2009 school year, Sequoia has offered a BUILD elective to 9th grade students, typically taken as a seventh class. With support from the BUILD organization, students learn business techniques and apply them to a small product that their team has engineered. In some years, the student teams sell their products to Sequoia students at lunch, and learn social media marketing strategies as they publicize their products digitally. (The school formerly offered a business/information technology program, with classes in computer repair, computer-aided design, and IB Information Technology in a Global Society, but due to low enrollment, the program ended after the 2017–2018 school year.)

Digital Arts Academy (DAA) 
Offered as a small school-within-a-school to students, the Digital Arts Academy provides students the opportunity to explore careers within technology. It is the oldest continuous partnership academy in California, originally named the Electronic Arts Academy until its rebranding in 2015. Students apply in the spring of their 9th grade year and enroll in the program for their 10th through 12th grade years. The program is funded through a grant from the State of California that is matched by the District and industry partners, allowing classes to be capped at 25 students and providing teachers with resources that can be used to infuse the curriculum with technology and provide extra support to students. Within the Academy, students take four classes per year: English, Science, Social Studies, and a technology elective (Digital Filmmaking, Multimedia I, and Multimedia II). Besides gaining experience with professional software, students are also paired with a mentor that works in Silicon Valley, allowing them to learn job skills and business etiquette through one-on-one activities, workshops, job shadows, and mock interviews.

Health Careers Academy (HCA) 
Similar to the Digital Arts Academy, the Health Careers Academy is a small learning community for 10th through 12th grade students at Sequoia, focused on preparing students for college-level education in health care fields or a career in the health care industry following graduation. Teachers "loop" with students and move with them through their years in the program within a specific subject area, such as English, Science, Social Studies, and Career Technical Education. The program provides students real-world experiences in health care fields through professional mentors, certification programs, and internships at local companies. In the 2019–2020 school year, students attended a field trip to the Redwood City Fire Department, where they practiced Community Emergency Response Team (CERT) skills and performed mock emergency situations. Through partnerships with local organizations, students in the Academy also host various events on campus, including an annual Health Fair and a youth heart screening. On March 4, 2019, the HCA was recognized by the California Department of Education at a conference in Sacramento, where it was selected as one of seven distinguished academies in the state, out of nearly 400 other programs.

International Baccalaureate Programme (IB) 
Sequoia High School began offering the International Baccalaureate Programme in February 2002, under Principal Morgan Marchbanks. Although the official IB curriculum does not begin until junior year, students can take ICAP ("International College Advancement Program") classes in freshman and sophomore year. Sequoia High School offers a wide range of IB classes for students in English, history, math, science, electives, and languages. Students can choose to take one or several IB classes to pursue an IB certificate, or they can choose to partake in the full IB Diploma, which includes taking an IB class in each of the six main subject areas, taking an additional Theory of Knowledge (TOK) class, writing a 4,000-word Extended Essay (EE) research paper, and completing Creativity, Activity, and Service (CAS) hours. The International Baccalaureate Programme allows the students a wide range of opportunities because the course material is worldwide. It prepares them for college as the course is rigorous, but helps each student adapt to the work load. At the end of the last year, similar to the AP test, the students take IB tests which go on throughout the month of May. As of the 2020–2021 school year, Sequoia offers 18 unique IB classes.

Between 2014 and 2017, Sequoia High School was one of five high schools in the U.S. selected to participate in an educational improvement project funded by the Michael and Susan Dell Foundation, with the goal of increasing the number of low-income students participating and succeeding in Sequoia's IB program.

Statistics

Demographics
2020–2021

 2,019 students: 1,030 male (51.0%), 989 female (49.0%)

Among the student body:

 16.8% of students are English language learners
 15.7% of students receive special education services
 0.3% of students are foster youth
 0.1% of students are homeless
 1.0% of students are migrant
 46.2.0% of students are eligible for free and reduced-price lunch

2015–2016
 2,143 students: 1,096 male (51.1%), 1,047 female (48.9%)

Population and graduation rates

Standardized testing

Notable alumni

Athletes 
 Gary Beban (class of 1964), Heisman Trophy winner in 1967, briefly played professional football for the Washington Redskins
 Spencer Folau (class of 1991), 2000 Super Bowl championship with the Baltimore Ravens
 James Gaughran (class of 1950), Olympic water polo athlete, Melbourne 1956, member of the United States Water Polo Hall of Fame
 John Harlin II (class of 1953), American mountaineer, famous for Harlin's Route, north face of the Eiger 
 Will "Powerhouse Hobbs" Hobson, professional wrestler signed with AEW
 Charles Johnson, professional basketball player for the Golden State Warriors 
 Paul McClellan, Major League Baseball (MLB) player for the San Francisco Giants 
 Paul Noce, former MLB player with the Chicago Cubs 
 Dick Sharon (class of 1968), former MLB player 
 Dick Stuart (class of 1951), former MLB player with the Pittsburgh Pirates
 Bob Svihus (class of 1961), played with the Oakland Raiders and the New York Jets from 1965–1973
 Tim Twietmeyer, ultramarathon runner, best known for completing the Western States Endurance Run more than 25 times in under 24 hours.

Arts and entertainment 
 Eric Dane (in school as Eric Feldman 1987–1990), actor on Grey's Anatomy and Marley & Me
 Tim Genis (class of 1984), Boston Symphony lead timpanist
 Kenny Ortega (class of 1968), director and choreographer for the High School Musical franchise
 Lydia Pense (class of 1966), musician and singer in the band Cold Blood; was in a Sequoia High School band called The Dimensions (in 1963)
 Ronnie Day, (class of 2006, graduated early to focus on his music career), musician

Business 
 Ray Dolby (class of 1951), founder of Dolby Laboratories
 Gordon Moore (class of 1946), co-founder of Intel Corporation, best known for Moore's Law

Politics 
 William Royer (class of 1938), member of the U.S. House of Representatives

Scholar and education 
 Donna Boutelle, historian, professor at Cal State Long Beach
 Steven G. Krantz (class of 1967), scholar, mathematician and author of more than 50 books

See also

 Redwood City School District (RCSD)
 San Mateo County high schools

References

External links

 
 Sequoia Alumni Network website

School buildings on the National Register of Historic Places in California
Educational institutions established in 1895
International Baccalaureate schools in California
High schools in San Mateo County, California
Public high schools in California
1895 establishments in California
Education in Redwood City, California
National Register of Historic Places in San Mateo County, California
Historic districts on the National Register of Historic Places in California